Perfect Match (2002) is the ninth novel by the American author, Jodi Picoult. The novel explores the themes of family conflict, individual inner turmoil and guilt, personal and professional conflict, and vengeance. Though primarily, the novel focuses on child sexual abuse and (justifiable) murder. Unlike many of Picoult's other novels, Perfect Match does not follow the back-and-forth flashback format.

Plot summary

The story begins with a prologue, in which an unnamed female character enters a courtroom and inexplicably shoots and kills the defendant after shooting him four times as he approaches his defense attorney. The shooter is revealed to be the York County, Maine, Assistant District Attorney, Nina Frost, and the defendant is Father Szyszynski. At the time of the trial (and shooting), Nina believed that Father Szyszynski had sexually abused her five-year-old son, Nathaniel, who confides via verbal accusation that Father "Glen" Szyszynski molested him. Further, laboratory tests confirmed that Father Szyszynski's bodily fluids were found in the child's underpants. 

It is later revealed that Nina had killed the wrong man, and a visiting priest named Father Gwynne, not Father Glen, had molested Nathaniel. However, Fathers Gwynne and Szyszynski shared the same DNA because Father Szyszynski had a bone marrow transplant from Father Gwynne (being that they were half brothers), leading to the belief that the semen on Nathaniel's underpants belonged to Szyszynski. Although this fact was entered into evidence at Nina's own murder trial, after which the jury could not reach a verdict, the judge ultimately ruled that Nina's reasons were justified. As such, Nina was found not guilty of murder. However, under Maine jurisprudence, Nina was found guilty of manslaughter because the judge believed she was under the influence of a reasonable fear or anger brought about by reasonable provocation. Nina was sentenced to 20 years in prison, but this sentence was suspended.

In a final twist at the end, Nina's best friend and colleague Patrick Ducharme, moves away. Nina had a very brief affair with Patrick, during a short split from her husband, Caleb. Nina also later discovers that Caleb had poisoned Father Gwynne, with antifreeze, despite Caleb's earlier admonishment towards her killing Father Szyszynski.

Main characters
 Nathaniel Patrick Frost: The five-year-old boy who is molested and whose confession about the abuse sparks the central conflict in the novel. 
 Nina Maurier Frost: Nathaniel's mother, Caleb's wife, an assistant district attorney who kills Father Szyszynski. 
 Caleb Frost: Nathaniel's father and Nina's husband, a stonemason who poisoned Father Gwynne, and his cat. 
 Patrick Ducharme: A police detective and close friend of Nina's. Patrick expresses his love for Nina on several occasions, but is constantly reminded that they cannot be together. Also a reoccurring character, appearing in Picoult's novel, Nineteen Minutes. 
 Father Gwynne: A visiting priest at the Frost's church that molests Nathaniel, who is coincidentally Father Szyszynski's half-brother. 
 Father Glen Szyszynski: A priest at the Frost's church that was falsely accused and murdered for molesting Nathaniel.

See also

Pedophilia
Child sexual abuse
Eyewitness testimony 
Catholic Church sex abuse scandal

References
Hood, Ann, Breaking Faith, Review, The Washington Post; May 5, 2002; T.06
Rhule, Patty, [https://pqasb.pqarchiver.com/USAToday/access/117570596.html?dids=117570596:117570596&FMT=ABS&FMTS=ABS:FT&date=May+2%2C+2002&author=Patty+Rhule&pub=USA+TODAY&edition=&startpage=D.07&desc=Love+and+hate+are+%27Perfect+Match%27+%3B+Mom+turns+vigilante+after+son%27s+molestation Love and hate are 'Perfect Match' ; Mom turns vigilante after son's molestation], Review, USA Today; May 2, 2002
Vidmos, Robin, Murder or Justice? D.A.'s vigilante action poses questions of pride, ethics and fairness, Review,  The Denver Post, April 21, 2002; Page EE-01

External links
 Perfect Match entry on official Jodi Picoult website

2002 American novels
American crime novels
Novels by Jodi Picoult

Novels about child abuse
Child sexual abuse in literature